Bundalong is a town in Victoria, Australia located on the Murray River and the Murray Valley Highway, east of Yarrawonga. Bundalong is in the Shire of Moira local government area, with the name "Bundalong" being the Aboriginal word for "joined together". The towns farming sites include wheat plantations.

History
The Bundalong Post office opened on 2 October 1876 and closed in 1940.

References

Towns in Victoria (Australia)
Shire of Moira
Populated places on the Murray River